The Poker Star is an Australian reality game show broadcast on One from 26 September 2009. It is created and hosted by former World Series of Poker Champion Joe Hachem, who will also act as judge and mentor to the contestants. New Zealand poker champion Lee Nelson will also appear as a judge. The series is sponsored by PokerStars.

The show pits eleven amateur poker players against each other in a series of challenges that tests the principles of "Joe's Code", rules that Hachem believes are beneficial for success in life and for being a successful poker player. Players compete for $100,000 in cash and entry to four of the world's biggest poker tournaments, with Hachem continuing to join them as their personal mentor.

Over 18,000 people applied for the first series.

The 1st season saw 33-year-old speech pathologist and mother of two Amanda become 'The Poker Star', beating out the other two members of the final three, Josh and Chris. Amanda stated during the final episode that the $100,000 prize money would go a long way to helping with the mortgage on the home she had recently purchased for herself and her two daughters.

Players

Weekly results

 * The player(s) won the weekly challenge.
 ** Invited to play were professional poker players Eric Assoudourian (3rd), Celina Lin (4th) and Emad Tahtouh (last).

 The player became The Poker Star.
 The player was sent to the elimination room.
 The player was eliminated.

Weekly summary

Week 1: "Reading People"
Air date: 30 September 2009 (special advance screening: 26 September 2009)
Challenge: The contestants get to know each other and must decide who is the strongest player and who is the weakest player.
Challenge winner: Josh
Tournament winner: Ben ($1,000)
Eliminated: Tom

Week 2: "Focus"
Air date: 7 October 2009
Challenge: The contestants must maintain their focus in the shark tank at the Melbourne Aquarium.
Challenge winner: Chris
Tournament winner: Amanda ($1,500)
Eliminated: Martin

Week 3: "Bluffing"
Air date: 14 October 2009
Challenge: The contestants must bluff their way through a job interview with the "human lie detector".
Challenge winner: Donna
Tournament winner: Ben ($2,000)
Eliminated: Sally

Week 4: "Composure"
Air date: 21 October 2009
Challenge: The contestants must maintain their composure as they build a house of cards whilst listening to loud music.
Challenge winner: Red team (Amanda, Chris, Donna, Shane)
Tournament winner: Chris ($2,500)
Eliminated: Ron

Week 5: "Recall"
Air date: 28 October 2009
Challenge: The contestants must recall a series of events they witnessed which includes a car accident.
Challenge winner: Katie
Tournament winner: Josh ($3,000)
Eliminated: Katie

Week 6: "Endurance"
Air date: 4 November 2009
Challenge: The contestants are put in front of a screen with a blinking eye and must record every time the eye blinks.
Challenge winner: Josh
Tournament winner: Josh ($5,000)
Eliminated: Donna, Shane

Week 7: "Courage"
Air date: 11 November 2009
Challenge: The contestants get to live the high-life by walking across a thin plank of wood between two buildings, 16 floors above the ground.
Challenge winner: Amanda, Ben, Chris, Josh
Tournament winner: Josh ($7,500)
Eliminated: Ben

Week 8: "Charisma"
Air date: 18 November 2009
Challenge: The contestants are brought to a press conference where they have to answer questions on the spot from a team of reporters.
Challenge winner: No challenge winner
Tournament winner: Chris ($10,000)
Eliminated: Josh, Chris
The Poker Star: Amanda

References

PokerStars
2009 Australian television series debuts
2009 Australian television series endings
2000s Australian reality television series
Television shows about poker
Poker in Australia
10 Bold original programming
Australian sports television series